Elymais or Elamais (Ἐλυμαΐς, Hellenic form of the more ancient name, Elam) was an autonomous state of the 2nd century BC to the early 3rd century AD, frequently a vassal under Parthian control. It was located at the head of the Persian Gulf in Susiana (the present-day region of Khuzestan, Iran). Most of the population probably descended from the ancient Elamites, who once had control of that area.

General information 
The Elymaeans were reputed to be skilled archers. In 187 BC, they killed Antiochus III the Great after he had pillaged their temple of Bel. Nothing is known of their language, even though Elamite was still used by the Achaemenid Empire 250 years before the kingdom of Elymais came into existence. A number of Aramaic inscriptions are found in Elymais. 

The region's "wealth in silver and gold" is referred to in the deutero-canonical work 1 Maccabees, which refers to Elymais as a "city" of interest to Antiochus IV Epiphanes: the narrative there states that "its temple was very rich, containing golden coverings, breastplates, and weapons left there by Alexander son of Philip, the Macedonian king who first reigned over the Greeks. So [Antiochus] came and tried to take the city and plunder it, but he could not because his plan had become known to the citizens." Jewish historian Uriel Rappaport notes that the author of 1 Maccabees was "mistaken" - "Elymais was not a city but a country" - and that "no story about treasures [Alexander] left in Elymais is mentioned elsewhere".

The provinces of Elymais were Massabatice (later Masabadhan), Corbiane and Gabiane. Susa lay to the east of the territory of Elymais. The kingdom of Elymais survived until its extinction by a Sasanian invasion in the early 3rd century AD.

Coinage

The coins of Elymais depicted a king; it is not known whether this was a Parthian king or a local ruler, as such information has not come to light. These coins were based on Greek standards of debased Drachms and Tetradrachms. The royal picture is generally based on Parthian coinage, usually with an anchor with a star in crescent figure. The reverse has a figure or bust of Artemis with text around it, an eagle, or often only elongated dots (this has led numismatists to believe that the engravers didn't know Greek or copied from coins whose writing was already unintelligible).

A variant of Aramaic, which was more conservative than the contemporary Late Old Eastern Aramaic spoken in eastern Mesopotamia, has been recorded in Elymais until the rise of the Sasanians.  The chancellery of Elymais developed its own variant of the Aramaic alphabet, which was characterized by cursive letters and frequent use of ligatures, apparently influenced by the contemporary Parthian chancellery script. However, there is no evidence that Aramaic was a spoken language in Elymais. It is recorded only in coins (since Orodes III) and inscriptions, such as those of Tang-e Sarvak.

List of kings

Kamnaskirid dynasty 
Kamnaskires I Soter ( 147 BC ?)
Kamnaskires II Nikephoros (c. 147–139 BC)
From 140/139 BC, Elymais was then under direct Parthian control for several decades, with occasional rebellions, until around 82 BC. Known usurpers or rebels include:
Okkonapses (c. 139/138–137 BC)
Tigraios (c. 137–132 BC)
Darius Soter (c. 129 BC)
Pittit (125–124 BC)
Kamnaskires III with Anzaze (c. 82–62/61 BC)
Kamnaskires IV (1st century BC)
Kamnaskires V (late 1st century BC)
Kamnaskires VI (mid/late 1st century AD)

Arsacid dynasty 

Orodes I (late 1st century)
Orodes II (late 1st/early 2nd century)
Phraates (late 1st/early 2nd century)
Osroes (2nd century)
Orodes III with Ulfan (2nd century)
Abar-Basi (2nd century)
Orodes IV (from  165/170)
Khwasak (3rd century)
Orodes V (3rd century)

Notes

References

Bibliography
 
 
 Pakzadian, Hasan. "The Coins of Elymais", Tehran, 2007. (in Persian)

External links
Elymais coinage
About Elymais and the type of coinage
https://web.archive.org/web/20051223234605/http://www.grifterrec.com/coins/elymais/elymais.html
http://www.seleukids.org/Elymais.html 
Some history and coin definitions

 
140s BC establishments
States and territories established in the 2nd century BC
Parthian Empire
Ancient peoples
Numismatics
Former countries in the Middle East